A partial lunar eclipse will take place on 5 April 2099.

Visibility

Related lunar eclipses 
See: List of 21st-century lunar eclipses

Half-Saros cycle
A lunar eclipse will be preceded and followed by solar eclipses by 9 years and 5.5 days (a half saros). This lunar eclipse is related to two partial solar eclipses of Solar Saros 150.

See also 
List of lunar eclipses and List of 21st-century lunar eclipses

Notes

External links 
 

2099-04
2099-04
2099 in science